Jack Paepke (August 28, 1922 – November 7, 2014) was an American minor league baseball player, manager and player-manager who became a Major League Baseball coach and scout.

Playing career
A native of Provo, Utah, Paepke had a 15-year playing career as a combination pitcher and catcher, with three seasons missed during World War II. He began his career in the Brooklyn Dodgers' organization with Santa Barbara in the California League during the  season. He had nine wins and five losses with a 3.44 ERA. Before the season ended, Paepke joined the military, where he remained for the duration of the war. In , he returned to Montreal and also played for the Fort Worth Cats in the Texas League where he posted a 2.17 ERA.

After a brief stint back in Santa Barbara, Paepke played for the Hollywood Stars in the Pacific Coast League through the  campaign. In  he joined the Pittsburgh Pirates' organization, appearing for the New Orleans Pelicans in the Southern Association.

Manager and coach
He helped his own cause quite a bit by hitting .318 with 21 HRs and 109 RBI while compiling a 4–1 record on the mound. He was equally successful the following year when he led his Waco Pirates to Big State League crown. This Waco team won 105 games and has been named one of the top 25 minor league teams of all time by minor league baseball's official website. As he wound his way through the Pirate farm system, Paepke saw no more postseasons as a manager. Along the way he made stops as skipper of the Billings Mustangs, Salinas Packers, Kinston Eagles, Jamestown Falcons, Grand Forks Chiefs, San Jose Pirates and Las Vegas Wranglers. He ended his playing and managing career after the  season.

He was later a scout for the Angels and eventually the Montreal Expos. His son Dennis, a catcher, played in all or parts of four seasons in the major leagues for the Kansas City Royals.

References

External links
 
 Coach's page from Retrosheet
 Article on Waco team

1922 births
2014 deaths
Baseball coaches from Utah
Baseball player-managers
Baseball players from Utah
Billings Mustangs managers
Billings Mustangs players
Brunswick Pirates players
California Angels coaches
California Angels scouts
Fort Worth Cats players
Grand Forks Chiefs players
Jamestown Falcons players
Las Vegas Wranglers players
Los Angeles Angels coaches
Major League Baseball bullpen coaches
Montreal Expos scouts
Montreal Royals players
New Orleans Pelicans (baseball) players
St. Paul Saints (AA) players
San Jose Pirates players
Santa Barbara Dodgers players
Santa Barbara Saints players
Sportspeople from Provo, Utah
Waco Pirates players